Following is a list of all Article III United States federal judges appointed by President Benjamin Harrison during his presidency. In total Harrison appointed 42 Article III federal judges, including 4 Justices to the Supreme Court of the United States, 12 judges to the United States courts of appeals and United States circuit courts and 26 judges to the United States district courts.

Additionally, Harrison appointed 1 judge to the United States Court of Claims and 10 members to the Board of General Appraisers (later the United States Customs Court), both Article I tribunals.

The Judiciary Act of 1891, approved March 3, 1891, established the United States courts of appeals. Prior to the passage of that act, United States Circuit Judges were appointed solely to the existing United States circuit courts. Subsequent to the passage of that act, United States Circuit Judges were concurrently appointed to both the United States courts of appeals and the United States circuit courts. This situation persisted until the abolition of the United States circuit courts on December 31, 1911. Starting January 1, 1912, United States Circuit Judges served only upon their respective United States court of appeals.

Thus, the first 2 United States Circuit Judges appointed during Harrison's administration were appointed solely to the United States circuit court for their respective circuit and were reassigned by operation of law to serve concurrently on the United States court of appeals and United States circuit court on June 16, 1891. The 10 United States Circuit Judges appointed by Harrison after June 16, 1891 were appointed concurrently to the United States court of appeals and United States circuit court.

United States Supreme Court justices

Courts of appeals and circuit courts

District courts

Specialty courts (Article I)

United States Court of Claims

Board of General Appraisers

Notes

Renominations

References
General

 

Specific

Sources
 Federal Judicial Center

Harrison, Benjamin

Presidency of Benjamin Harrison